Lauren Cohan (born January 7, 1982) is an American-British actress best known for her role as Maggie Greene in the AMC post-apocalyptic horror television series The Walking Dead (2011–2018; 2020–2022). Her other notable TV roles include Bela Talbot in the dark fantasy drama Supernatural (2007–2008), Rose in the supernatural teen drama The Vampire Diaries (2010–2012), Vivian McArthur Volkoff in the action comedy Chuck (2011), and Francesca "Frankie" Trowbridge in the action comedy-drama Whiskey Cavalier (2019). Her film appearances include the comedy Van Wilder: The Rise of Taj (2006), the psychological thriller horror The Boy (2016), the biographical drama All Eyez on Me (2017), and the action thriller Mile 22 (2018).

Early life
Cohan was born Lauren Storholm in Cherry Hill, New Jersey, to American father Paul Storholm and Scottish mother, Susan Cohan (née Moorhouse), who are now divorced. She was raised in New Jersey until age 13, when her family moved to her mother's native UK, settling in Surrey. In addition to Cherry Hill, Cohan lived for one year in the state of Georgia before her family moved to the UK.

Lauren's surname was legally changed to that of her stepfather, Cohan, and her mother converted to Judaism when she remarried. Lauren Cohan converted to Judaism at age five and had a Bat Mitzvah ceremony. Cohan is the only child of her parents, and has many younger half-siblings through her mother and father's remarriages. Her younger brother is Beverly Hills based British private chef, Daniel Cohan. Through one of her sisters Alia, she has a niece, Isla. Cohan graduated from King Alfred's College, Winchester (now the University of Winchester) with a Bachelor of Arts degree in drama and English literature before touring with a theatre company she co-founded at the university.

Career

Film
In 2006, after her film debut in Casanova (2005) as Sister Beatrice, Cohan starred in the sequel to Van Wilder (2002), Van Wilder: The Rise of Taj, as Charlotte Higginson. Her next role was in the 2008 film Float. In February 2010, she was cast in Death Race 2 and was the lead in the 2016 supernatural-horror The Boy. Also in 2016, she appeared as Martha Wayne (Batman's deceased mother) in Batman v Superman: Dawn of Justice and played Leila Steinberg in the 2017 biographical drama All Eyez on Me.

Television
In 2007, Cohan garnered her first major supporting role – partially also described as a season lead – when she was cast for season three of Supernatural as Bela Talbot, a thief who procures valuable supernatural objects and sells them to very rich, very powerful people in the supernatural world. The character appeared in six episodes of the series, her last in the penultimate episode of season three titled "Time Is on My Side".

Cohan played the recurring character Rose, a 560-year-old vampire, in The Vampire Diaries. In 2011, she joined the television series Chuck in a recurring role playing Vivian McArthur Volkoff, a "charming, sophisticated socialite" from the United Kingdom, and the daughter of primary villain, Alexei Volkoff. She also guest starred on shows such as Archer, Cold Case, CSI: NY, Life, and Modern Family.

Cohan starred in a pilot for The CW called Heavenly (2011) in which she played the lead character, Lily, an attorney who teams up with an angel; however, it was not picked up as a series.

In April 2011, Cohan was cast in her most notable role as Maggie Greene (later Maggie Rhee) on The Walking Dead, an AMC post-apocalyptic horror television series based on the comic book series of the same name. She first appeared in season two as a recurring character, but she became a series regular at the start of season three. The drama was the highest-rated series in cable television history in 2015. At the conclusion of the eighth season of The Walking Dead, Cohan completed her contract obligations as a series regular. It was later reported Cohan had not reached an agreement to sign on for season nine as a main cast member due to a pay dispute, as she demanded an enhanced salary closer to the salaries of her male co-stars Andrew Lincoln and Norman Reedus. AMC refused, and Cohan began making herself available for TV pilots. Cohan eventually reached an agreement to appear in five episodes in the first half of season nine of The Walking Dead and departed the series in 2018.

In early 2018, in the midst of her contract negotiations with AMC regarding The Walking Dead, Cohan was cast as CIA operative Francesca "Frankie" Trowbridge in the ABC action comedy-drama Whiskey Cavalier. Whiskey Cavalier was picked up to series in May 2018 and premiered on February 24, 2019. ABC did not renew the series for a second season. In October 2019, it was reported that Cohan would return to The Walking Dead as a series regular in the series' eleventh and final season. Furthermore, showrunner Angela Kang indicated that Cohan might appear during the series' then-current tenth season as well.

Personal life
Cohan splits her time and work between London and Los Angeles.

Filmography

Film

Television

Video games

Awards and nominations

References

External links

 
 

1982 births
21st-century American actresses
Actresses from New Jersey
Actresses from Surrey
Alumni of the University of Winchester
American film actresses
American people of Irish descent
American people of Norwegian descent
American people of Scottish descent
American expatriates in England
American stage actresses
American television actresses
Converts to Judaism
Jewish American actresses
Living people
People from Cherry Hill, New Jersey
People from Greater Los Angeles
21st-century English women
21st-century English people
21st-century American Jews